Viola douglasii is a species of violet known by the common name Douglas' violet,  or Douglas' golden violet. It is native to western North America from Oregon through California and into Baja California, where it grows in seasonally moist habitat, often on serpentine soils. This rhizomatous herb produces a cluster of erect stems just a few centimeters in length to about 20 centimeters in maximum height. The leaf blades are deeply dissected into several narrow lobes or compound, made up of leaflets, and borne on long petioles. They are hairless to softly hairy in texture. A solitary flower is borne on a long, upright stem. It has five bright or deep yellow petals with brown veining and brown outer surfaces. The largest lowest petal may be over 2 centimeters in length.

External links
Jepson Manual Treatment
Photo gallery

References 

douglasii
Flora of Baja California
Flora of California
Flora of Oregon
Flora without expected TNC conservation status